Lupe o le Soaga is a Samoan football club based in Tuanaimato. It currently plays in the Samoa National League.

History
Lupe o le Soaga played in the First Division, the second tier of the Samoa National League during the 2011–12 season where they finished runners-up to Vaimoso. Apparently they were promoted as they then played in the 2012-13 Samoa National League, which they won, losing only once throughout the whole season. They also won the Samoa Cup, defeating Kiwi 2–1 in the final. Kiwi took the lead, but Lupe equalised with a penalty. An additional twenty minutes extra time was played and in the second half of extra time Lupe scored the winner. The Lupe ole Soaga women's team were runner's-up in the 2012–13 women's cup final.

In the 2020 edition of the OFC Champions League they became the first team coming from the qualifying stage to win a group stage match.

In 2020 it was the top-ranked team in the national league.

The team won all three of its matches in the 2023 OFC Champions League qualifying stage, qualifying for the 2023 OFC Champions League.

Titles
Samoa National League: 7

2012–13
2014–15
2016
2017
 2019                     
 2020
 2021
Samoa Cup: 1
2012-13

Current technical staff

Current squad
Squad for the 2020 OFC Champions League Premiliminary Stage

References

Football clubs in Samoa